Jarkko Nieminen was the defending champion, but he lost in the first round to Jürgen Zopp, who won the title, defeating Dudi Sela in the final, 6–4, 5–7, 7–6(8–6).

Seeds

Draw

Finals

Top half

Bottom half

References 
 Main Draw
 Qualifying Draw

IPP Open - Singles
2014 Singles